Str8 off tha Streetz of Muthaphukkin Compton is the second and final studio album by American hip hop recording artist Eazy-E. It was released posthumously by Ruthless Records and Relativity Records on January 30, 1996, ten months after Eazy-E's death in March 1995. The album spawned the single, "Just tah Let U Know".

Album information
Released posthumously after Wright's 1995 death from AIDS, Str8 off tha Streetz of Muthaphukkin Compton was, according to Gerrick D. Kennedy in his book Parental Discretion Is Advised: The Rise of N.W.A and the Dawn of Gangsta Rap, "... completed with Yella's assistance. It was cobbled together using leftover records and scraps of songs he had yet to complete for his ... "double album titled Temporary Insanity intended for release in January 1993.

Reception

Entertainment Weekly (1996) – "[...] it's his most musically varied and enjoyable album [...] On Str8 Off tha Streetz, he leaves our consciousness the same way he entered — rough, raunchy, embattled, and utterly unapologetic." – Rating: B

Track listing

Personnel

Thomas Sylvester Allen – songwriter & percussion (track 5)
Harold Ray Brown – songwriter & drums (track 5)
Antoine Carraby – songwriter & producer (tracks 1–2, 5, 7–8, 11, 13), co-producer (track 14)
Kevyn "Shaki" Carter – production coordinator, featured artist & songwriter (track 12)
Giulio Costanzo – illustrator, design
Anthony Shawn Criss – songwriter & producer (tracks 6, 9)
Donald Cunningham – art director, design
Morris Dewayne Dickerson – songwriter & bass (track 5)
Peter Dokus – cover photography
Bobby "Bobcat" Ervin – producer & songwriter (tracks 3, 10)
Makeba Fields – featured artist & songwriter (track 13)
Brian Knapp Gardner – mastering
Keir Lamont Gist – songwriter & producer (tracks 6, 9)
Julio Gonzales – songwriter (tracks 12, 14)
Tony Gonzalez – songwriter & producer (tracks 12, 14)
Arlandis Hinton – featured artist & songwriter (tracks 2, 5, 13)
Tanesha L. Hudson – featured artist & songwriter (track 13)
La'Mar Lorraine Johnson – featured artist & songwriter (track 2)
Leroy "Lonnie" Jordan – songwriter & keyboards (track 5)
Lee Oskar Levitin – songwriter & harmonica (track 5)
C. Lloyd – songwriter (tracks 3, 10)
Charles W. Miller – songwriter & saxophone (track 5)
Reginald "Big Reg" Pace – songwriter (track 4)
Lorenzo Jerald Patterson – featured artist, songwriter & co-producer (track 7)
Mark "Big Man" Rucker – songwriter (track 1)
Mike "Crazy Neck" Sims – bass & guitar (tracks 1–2, 5, 7–8, 11, 13)
Donovan "Tha Dirt Biker" Sound – recording & mixing
John Tovio – songwriter (track 8)
Angelo Trotter IV – songwriter & producer (track 4)
Roger Troutman – featured artist, songwriter & producer (track 14)
David "Rhythm D" Weldon – songwriter (track 2)
Andre Wicker – featured artist & songwriter (tracks 2, 5, 13)
Eric "Eazy E" Wright – main artist, executive producer, songwriter (tracks 1–2, 4–8, 11, 13–14)

Charts

Weekly charts

Year-end charts

Certifications

See also
List of number-one R&B albums of 1996 (U.S.)

References

Eazy-E albums
1995 albums
Albums published posthumously
Ruthless Records albums
G-funk albums